Jean-Claude Combaz (born 8 December 1856 in Saint-Béron) was a French clergyman and bishop for the Roman Catholic Archdiocese of Nagasaki. He was ordained in 1880. He was appointed in 1912. He died in 1926.

References

French Roman Catholic bishops
1856 births
1926 deaths
Date of death missing